Edward Alexander Chupa (August 2, 1918 – October 30, 2013) was an American football player and coach. He served as the head football coach at Hiram College in Hiram, Ohio from 1953 to 1954 and at Washington & Jefferson College in Washington, Pennsylvania from 1956 to 1959, compiling a career college football coaching record of 12–24–2.

Head coaching record

References

1918 births
2013 deaths
Hiram Terriers football coaches
Murray State Racers football players
Washington & Jefferson Presidents football coaches
High school football coaches in Ohio
Case Western Reserve University alumni
People from Indiana County, Pennsylvania
Sportspeople from Lorain, Ohio
Players of American football from Ohio